Giovanni Nesti (23 September 1922 – 20 March 2011) was an Italian basketball player. He competed in the men's tournament at the 1948 Summer Olympics.

References

1922 births
2011 deaths
Italian men's basketball players
Olympic basketball players of Italy
Basketball players at the 1948 Summer Olympics
Sportspeople from Livorno